Chijoraji or Chijoragi is a name given to the infant Jesus carried in the hand of
the Virgin of Candelaria (called by the Guanches Chaxiraxi) in Tenerife. Chijoraji is the name the aboriginal Guanches applied to this representation of Christ.

References 
 Guanche Religion

Guanche mythology
African mythology

Canarian culture
Guanche gods
Sky and weather gods